Vehicle registration plates of Christmas Island started to be issued in 1972.  Current plates are Australian standard 372 mm × 134 mm, and the current series started in 2003.

Vehicle types

References 

Transport in Christmas Island
Christmas Island